Dhana Taprogge is a European singer-songwriter known for her work with the electronic pop band Taxi Doll. She released her first solo EP, Confessions of Lily Rogue, on November 11, 2010.

Musical career
Dhana Taprogge, European-born front-woman of Taxi Doll, is an accomplished songwriter whose music has been used in many films such as Firewall and John Tucker Must Die, and various television projects including The Hills, 90210, The Good Wife, and CSI: NY, and commercials worldwide.

After reaching success with Taxi Doll, Dhana decided to explore her creativity as a solo artist. In November 2010, she released an EP titled "Confessions of Lily Rogue," featuring electropop arrangements and more reflective undertones.

Discography
 Confessions of Lily Rogue EP (2010)

References

External links 
 Official website
 Facebook
 Dhana's "Not Enough (Remix)" Video
 Taxi Doll on Myspace

Living people
German women singers
German singer-songwriters
Year of birth missing (living people)